The Heheya Kingdom (also known as Haihaya, Haiheya, Heiheya) was a kingdom ruled by the Yadava people. They are thought to be descended from Yadu (Yadav), a legendary king of the Chandravamsha lineage.  One of the most well known Haihaya rulers was Kartavirya Arjuna.

It is believed that the Kingdom was involved in a number of conflicts with neighbouring kingdoms. But it was ultimately defeated by the Bhargava leader Parashurama.

The capital of the Heheya Kingdom was Mahishmati, located on the banks of the Narmada River in present-day Madhya Pradesh.

Haihaya clans
The Haihayas were an ancient confederacy of five ganas (clans), who claimed their common ancestry from Yadu. According to the Harivamsha Purana (34.1898), Haihaya was the great-grandson of Yadu and grandson of Sahasrajit. In the Vishnu Purana (IV.11), all the five Haihaya clans are mentioned together as the Talajanghas. The five Haihaya clans were Vitihotra, Sharyata, Bhoja, Avanti and Tundikera. The Haihayas were native to the present-day Malwa region of Western Madhya Pradesh. The Puranas style the Haihayas as the first ruling dynasty of Mahishmati.

Foundation of Mahishmati
In the Harivamsha (33.1847), the future capital city of Mahishmati (in present-day Madhya Pradesh) was said to be founded by King Mahishmant, believed to be son of Sahanja and a descendant of Yadu through Haihaya. Elsewhere in the Harivamsha, it names Muchukunda, believed to be an ancestor of Lord Rama, as the founder of Mahishmati, stating that he built the cities of Mahishmati and Purika in the Rksha mountains.

The sixth daughter of Angiras was called Mahismati the Pious according to Mahabharat.

Kartavirya Arjuna and his successors
According to the Mahabharata and the Puranas, the most celebrated Haihaya king was Kartavirya Arjuna, demonstrated in the epithet Sahasrabahu. He was called a Samrat and Chakravartin. His name is also found in the Rig Veda (VIII.45.26). He ultimately conquered Mahishmati city from Karkotaka Naga, a Naga chief, and made it his fortress capital. According to the Vayu Purana, he invaded Lanka and took Ravana prisoner. Arjuna propitiated Dattatreya and was favoured by him.  Arjuna's sons killed sage Jamadagni, and Jamadagni's son Parashurama in revenge killed Arjuna. Arjuna had a number of sons. His son Jayadhvaja succeeded him on the throne; Jayadhvaja was succeeded by his son Talajangha.

The Vitihotras
Later, the Haihayas were primarily known by the name of the dominant clan amongst them – the Vitihotras (or Vitahotras or Vitahvyas). According to the Puranas, Vitihotra was the great-grandson of Arjuna Kartavirya and the eldest son of Talajangha. The Puranas also mention the names of two Vitihotra rulers: Ananta, son of Vitihotra and Durjaya Amitrakarshana, son of Ananta. The northward expansion of the Haihaya territory to the mid-Ganges valley by the Vitihotra rulers was stopped by the Ikshvaku king Sagara. The Mahagovindasuttanta of the Dighanikaya mentions an Avanti king Vessabhu (Vishvabhu) and his capital Mahissati (Mahishmati). He was likely a Vitihotra ruler. During the rule of the later Vitihotras, the whole Avanti region probably developed into two realms, divided by the Vindhyas, having principal cities at Mahishmati and Ujjayini (present-day Ujjain). According to the Matsya Purana (5.37), Pulika, one of the ministers of Ripunjaya, the last Vitihotra king of Ujjayini, killed his master and made his son Pradyota the new king.

It is said that many of the Haihayas were learned in the Vedas.

Medieval Haihayas 
A number of early medieval dynasties, which include the Kalachuris and the Mushakavamsha Mushika Kingdom of Kerala, claimed their descent from the Haihayas. The Haihayas of eastern India fought against Islamic invaders in medieval times.

References in Mahabharata

Disputes with the Ikshvaku Kings
Sagara was a king of the Kosala Kingdom, ruling from Ayodhya. He was of the lineage of Ikshwaku, a famous royal dynasty in ancient India. Sagara is mentioned as the son of Jadu (MBh 12,56). His army numbered 60,000 men, all of whom he allegedly treated as sons. Sagara is said to have defeated the Haihayas and the Talajanghas. He brought under subjection the whole of the military class. (MBh 3,106)

The Haihayas and Talajanghas of the Vatsa Kingdom
The Haihayas and Talajanghas probably had their origins in the Vatsa Kingdom. The Haihayas in the Vatsa kingdom, known collectively as Vitahavyas under King Vitahavya, attacked the neighbouring country called Kasi, during the reign of four successive generations of Kasi kings: Haryaswa, Sudeva, Divodasa, and Pratarddana. The last one among them, Pratarddana, defeated the Haihayas and probably expelled them from the Vatsa kingdom. Kasi kings were also born in the race of Ikshwaku. This could be the seed of Haihayas's dispute with them (MBh 13,30).

Under Haryaswa's reign
In Saryati’s lineage (Saryati and Ikshwaku were two among the many sons of Manu [MBh 1,75]), two kings took their birth, Haihaya and Talajangha, both sons of Vatsa. Haihaya had ten wives and a hundred sons, all of whom were highly inclined to fighting. In Kasi there was also a king, known as Haryyaswa. The sons of King Haihaya, who was otherwise known as Vitahavyas, invaded the kingdom of Kasi. Advancing into that country which lies between the rivers Ganges and Yamuna, he fought a battle with King Haryyaswa, and killed him there. The sons of Haihaya then returned to their own city in the country of the Vatsas.

Under Sudeva
Haryyaswa’s son Sudeva was installed on the throne of Kasi as its new ruler. Known as a righteous-souled prince, he ruled the kingdom for some time before the hundred sons of Vitahavya once more invaded his dominions and defeated him in battle.

Under Divodasa
Divodasa, the son of Sudeva, was next installed on the throne of Kasi. Realising the prowess of the sons of Vitahavya, King Divodasa rebuilt and fortified the city of Varanasi (Varanasi or Banaras), reputedly at Indra's command. It was a prosperous territory that stretched northwards from the banks of Ganges to the southern banks of Gomati, and was said to resemble a second Amravati (the city of Indra). The Haihayas once again attacked. King Divodasa fought the enemy for a thousand days but at the end, having lost a number of followers and animals, he became exceedingly distressed. King Divodasa, his army lost and his treasury exhausted, left his capital and fled. He sought protection of his priest, Bharadwaja, the son of Vrihaspati.

Divodasa's son Pratarddana retaliates
Divodasa wished for a brave son who could avenge the Vitahavyas. With his priest Bharadwaja's blessings he had a son named Pratarddana. Divodasa installed his son on the throne of Kasi and asked him to march against the sons of Vitahavya. He speedily crossed the Ganges on his car followed by his army and proceeded against the city of the Vitahavyas. The Vitahavyas issued out of their city in their cars and poured out on Pratarddana, showering weapons of various kinds. Pratarddana killed them all in battle. The Haihaya king Vitahavya then sought the protection of his priest Bhrigu. Bhrigu converted him into a Brahmana. Sage Saunaka, later receiver of the entire Mahabharata narrative from Ugrasrava Sauti, was born from the line of this Vitahavya.

Haihaya King Kartavirya Arjuna
Kartavirya Arjuna (Sahastrabahu Arjun or Sahastrarjun) is described as a noble king and a devotee of Lord Dattatreya. Endowed with a thousand arms (thought to symbolise a thousand attendants acting as his hands, executing his commands) and great beauty, he is described as becoming lord of all the world. He had his capital in the city of Mahishmati. Keeping before him the duties of the Kshatriya order, as also humility and Vedic knowledge, the king made large gifts of wealth unto the Lord Dattatreya (MBh 13,152).

Other Haihaya Kings
King Vitahavya is mentioned as the son of Vatsa (MBh 13,30)
King Udvarta became the exterminator of his own race (MBh 5,74)
The conversation between a Haihaya king and a sage named Tarkshya is mentioned at MBh 3,183
As a royal sage of the Haihaya, Sumitra is mentioned by name at MBh 12,124. Sumitra is mentioned as the son of Mitra at MBh 12,125.

Enmity with the Bhargavas
The Haihaya tribe's dispute with the Bhargava Brahmins is mentioned at various points in the Mahabharata. The leader of the Bhargavas, Parasurama, son of Jamadagni, is said to have killed the Haihaya king Kartavirya Arjuna. The dispute did not end there. The Bhargavas went all over India and slew numerous Kshatriya kings, most of them kinsmen of Kartavirya Arjuna. (MBh 1,104)

In acquiring the unrivaled "battleaxe of fiery splendour and irresistible sharpness" from Mahadeva of the Gandhamadana mountains, in the Himalayas (MBh 12,49), Bhargava Rama became an unparalleled force on earth. Meanwhile, the mighty son of Kritavirya, Arjuna of the Kshatriya order and ruler of the Haihayas, imbued with great energy, highly virtuous in behaviour, and possessing a thousand arms through the grace of the great sage Dattatreya, and said to have subjugated in battle the whole earth, became a very powerful emperor. (12,49). This King Arjuna would be killed by Rama (MBh 3,115).

Signs of a tribal war
One tale relates how once the Brahmins, raising a standard of Kusa grass, encountered in battle the Kshatriyas of the Haihaya clan seemingly imbued with immeasurable energy. The best of Brahmins inquired of the Kshatriyas themselves as to the cause of this. The Kshatriyas told them, "In battle we obey the orders of one person imbued with great intelligence, while you are disunited from one another and act according to your individual understanding." The Brahmins then appointed one amongst themselves as their commander, who was brave and conversant with the ways of policy. And they then succeeded in vanquishing Haihaya the Kshatriyas (MBh 5,157).

Summary of the dispute
Bhargava Rama, having his father Jamadagni slain and his calf stolen by the Kshatriyas, slew Kartaviryas who had never been vanquished before by foes.
With his bow he slew 64 times 10,000 Kshatriyas. In that slaughter were included 14,000 Brahmana-hating Kshatriyas of the Dantakura country. Of the Haihayas, he slew a 1000 with his short club, a 1000 with his sword, and a 1000 by hanging. Rama slew 10,000 Kshatriyas with his axe. He could not quietly bear the furious speeches uttered by those foes of his. And when many foremost of Brahmans uttered exclamations, mentioning the name of Rama of Bhrigu’s race, he proceeding against the Kashmiras, the Daradas, the Kuntis, the Kshudrakas, the Malavas, the Angas, the Vangas, the Kalingas, the Videhas, the Tamraliptakas, the Rakshovahas, the Vitahotras, the Trigartas, the Martikavatas, counting by thousand, slew them all by means of his whetted shafts. Proceeding from province to province, he thus slew thousands of scores of Haihaya-Kshatriyas. Creating a deluge of blood and filling many lakes also with blood and bringing all the 18 islands under his subjection, he performed a 100 sacrifices (MBh 7,68).

References

Kisari Mohan Ganguli, The Mahabharata of Krishna-Dwaipayana Vyasa Translated into English Prose, 1883–1896.

External links

Kingdoms in the Ramayana
Yadava kingdoms
Kingdoms in the Mahabharata
Avanti (India)